Pacific Reserve Fleet, San Diego was a part of the United States Navy reserve fleets, also called a mothball fleet, was used to store the many surplus ships after World War II. The Pacific Reserve Fleet, San Diego was near the Naval Base San Diego in San Diego, California. Some ships in the fleet were reactivated for the Korean War and Vietnam War. The reserve fleet stored post World War I ships, some that were reactivated for World War II.

The USS Galveston (CL-93), a Cleveland-class cruiser was the last ship to depart the Pacific Reserve Fleet, San Diego. At the closing, only the Galveston and 11 other ships were remaining at the fleet. At its peak, 223 ships were stored in the fleet. The 12 rusty ships in fleet were sold off for scrapping and a few used for United States Navy target ships. The Pacific Reserve Fleet, San Diego closed in June 1975.

Pacific Reserve Fleet, San Diego ship examples
In the 1950 and 1960 many ships were stored in the fleet:
Seven Commencement Bay-class escort carriers
Four Casablanca-class escort carriers
Many Minesweepers, like the:
 USS Chief (AM-315)
USS Zeal (MSF-131)
USS Competent (AM-316)
USS Symbol (MSF-123)
USS San Jacinto (CVL-30)
USS Philippine Sea (CV-47)
USS Aristaeus
USS Midas (ARB-5)
USS Oceanus (ARB-2)
USS Zeus (ARB-4)
USS Telamon (ARB-8)
USS Sarpedon (ARB-7)
USS Phaon (ARB-3)

See also
USS Midway Museum

References

1946 establishments in California
Military in San Diego
Pacific Reserve Fleet, San Diego
Pacific Reserve Fleet, San Diego